The Boston Bruins, a professional ice hockey team based in Boston, Massachusetts, have had eight general managers in its team history. The franchise is a member of the Atlantic Division of the Eastern Conference of the National Hockey League (NHL). The franchise was founded in 1924 and entered the NHL as the first American-based expansion team, playing its initial seasons at the still-active Boston Arena. It is an Original Six team, along with the Toronto Maple Leafs, Detroit Red Wings, New York Rangers, Montreal Canadiens and Chicago Blackhawks. Its home arena is the 17,565-person capacity TD Garden, where it has played since 1995, after leaving the Boston Garden.

Key

General managers

See also
List of NHL general managers

Notes
 A running total of the number of general managers of the franchise. Thus any general manager who has two or more separate terms as general manager is only counted once. Interim general managers do not count towards the total.

References

Boston Bruins
 
Boston Bruins general managers
general managers